The National Students Union of India, is student wing of the Indian National Congress (INC or Congress), was established on 9 April 1971. The organisation was founded by Indira Gandhi after merging the Kerala Students Union and the West Bengal State Chhatra Parishad to form a national students' organisation.

Membership
In order to become a member of NSUI, one must be under 27 years of age, must be a student, must be a citizen of India, must not be part of any other political organisation and must not have been convicted of any criminal activity in past. NSUI categorizes its members into "Primary Members" and "Active Members". An aspiring member who applies for NSUI Membership, becomes a Primary member after the organisation's scrutiny process.

Students' Union elections
A 28-year-old from Kashmir Fairoz Khan was the face behind the National Student Union of India's (NSUI) victory in Delhi University student body polls. Within three months of being announced the national president of Congress’ student wing, Khan has made the party win in student body polls in the universities of four states—Punjab, Assam, Rajasthan and Delhi.  A student of the human rights department at the University of Jammu, Khan was chosen by Congress Vice-President Rahul Gandhi for the post. Khan, who belongs to a middle-class family of Pogal Paristan village in Kashmir, said, "We had trained 600 students at DU, with at least one student in every class, who discussed students’ problems. This process went on for a month before the election dates were announced. We did not ask the students to vote for NSUI. Our request to them was to Take Back DU."  Until now, Khan has managed to keep the NSUI a step ahead of its bitter rival—the RSS-backed Akhil Bharatiya Vidyarthi Parishad (ABVP). Giving credit of the victory to his team and the youth of the national capital who voted against violence and ‘forced nationalism’, Khan said, "Connecting with the  students face to face, and betting on the right people worked best for the party."  He believes any sort of suppression tactic over the students will not help.

Campaigns

'Burn the chaddi' campaign

In June 2022 during the Karnataka textbook controversy the Congress students' wing NSUI (National Students Union of India) protested against the saffronisation of school textbooks. As a symbolic protest they burnt an underwear outside the Home of Education Minister BC Nagesh. They set fire to a pair of khaki shorts similar to the short in the uniform of the Rashtriya Swayamsevak Sangh (RSS) members.

The BJP complained to the police accusing the NSUI activists of trying to burn the minister's house down. Siddaramaiah said, "During a protest, we symbolically burnt one underwear - just one underwear. But the police and government made it a big issue and said we are trying to burn the house... So let's start a chaddi-burning campaign,". The Congress launched a "burn-the-chaddi" campaign and Siddaramaiah announced that, as a sign of protest against RSS ‘chaddis’ would be burnt.

Controversies
In November 2013, two members of the NSUI were injured by police as they attempted to submit a memorandum to the district magistrate. In late November, the NSUI filed a complain with the police against Madhu Kishwar, a writer who ousted the journalist that had been allegedly sexually assaulted by Tarun Tejpal.
NSUI national secretary Akshay Kumar, who was also elected as the joint secretary of Delhi University Students' Union in 2010, allegedly submitted fake documents to secure admission in the Department of Buddhist Studies. An FIR (first information report) was filed against him by the Department of Buddhist Studies. In 2018, NSUI president Fairoz Khan stepped down from the post following the charges of sexual harassment against him.

JNU attack : Nikhil Savani, Gujarat NSUI general Secretary, among over 10 injured as student body clashes with ABVP during protest against campus violence. 

Prayagraj arresting : On 26 July 2022, NSUI workers protested vehemently at Allahabad University on Tuesday after the ED again called out Sonia Gandhi in the National Herald issue. Police arrested 15 protesters during the march. Those arrested are mainly Akhilesh Yadav, Himanshu Pachauri, Harkesh Kumar Harry, Amit Dwivedi, Satyam Kushwaha, Adarsh ​​Singh Bhadauria, Durgesh Kumar Singh Murari, Rishabh Pandey, Akshay Krantiveer, Ajay Pandey, Ravish Mishra, Shashank Dwivedi, Abhishek Shukla, Vivek Verma included.

Varanasi attack : Valay Dutt Bajpai, NSUI Uttar Pradesh East General Secretary, ABVP students attacked the hostel of Mahatma Gandhi Kashi Vidyapeeth because the ABVP was wiped out in the student union of Mahatma Gandhi Kashi Vidyapeeth.

See also
 All India Students' Federation
Students' Federation of India
 All India Students Association
 Akhil Bharatiya Vidyarthi Parishad
 Indian National Congress
 Indian Youth Congress
 Lists of political parties
 Neeraj Kundan

References

External links
 

 
1971 establishments in India
Student organizations established in 1971